Simon Marcil is a former Canadian politician who served as the Member of Parliament (MP) for the riding of Mirabel from 2015 to 2021. Marcil was first elected to the House of Commons of Canada in the 2015 election as a member of the Bloc Québécois. On February 28, 2018, however, Marcil, along with six other Bloc MPs, resigned from the Bloc's caucus to sit as an independent MP citing conflicts with the leadership style of Martine Ouellet. Following Ouellet's resignation, he rejoined the party on June 6, 2018. He was re-elected in the 2019 federal election.

On December 22, 2020, the National Post reported that Marcil had been on prolonged medical leave since January 31, 2020, all without informing his constituents. In January 2021, he announced he would not run again in the 2021 federal election.

Prior to his election, Marcil worked for Hydro-Québec.

Electoral record

References

Living people
Members of the House of Commons of Canada from Quebec
Bloc Québécois MPs
Hydro-Québec
People from Mirabel, Quebec
21st-century Canadian politicians
Québec debout MPs
Year of birth missing (living people)